Mary Kay Duvall (born September 6, 1962) is an American politician and a Republican member of the South Dakota House of Representatives representing District 24 since January 11, 2013.

Education
Duvall earned her BS in agricultural business from South Dakota State University.

Elections
2012 When incumbent Republican Representative Tad Perry ran for South Dakota Senate and left a District 24 seat open, Duvall ran in the three-way June 5, 2012 Republican Primary and placed first with 2,414 votes (35.9%) ahead of incumbent Representative Mark Venner, who placed third; Duvall and fellow Republican nominee Tim Rounds were unopposed for the November 6, 2012 General election, where Rounds took the first seat and Duvall took the second seat with 6,154 votes (45.92%).

References

External links
Official page at the South Dakota Legislature
Campaign site
 

Place of birth missing (living people)
Living people
Republican Party members of the South Dakota House of Representatives
People from Pierre, South Dakota
South Dakota State University alumni
Women state legislators in South Dakota
1962 births
21st-century American politicians
21st-century American women politicians